John David Dingell Jr. (July 8, 1926 – February 7, 2019) was an American politician who served as a member of the United States House of Representatives from 1955 until 2015. A member of the Democratic Party, he holds the record for longest-serving member of Congress in American history, representing Michigan for more than 59 years. He most recently served as the representative for Michigan's 12th congressional district. A longtime member of the House Energy and Commerce Committee, Dingell was the chairman of the committee from 1981 to 1995 and 2007 to 2009.

Born in Colorado Springs, Colorado, he attended Georgetown University as an undergraduate and law student. He left office on January 3, 2015. Having served for over 59 years, he has the longest congressional tenure in U.S. history. Together with Jamie Whitten and Joseph Gurney Cannon, he served in the house under 11 Presidents, which is the most of any representative. He was also the longest-serving Dean of the U.S. House of Representatives, who remained in the capacity from 1995 to 2015, and Dean of the Michigan congressional delegation. Dingell was one of the final two World War II veterans to have served in Congress; the other was Texas Representative Ralph Hall, who also left Congress in 2015. During his time in Congress in addition to protecting the automobile industry important to his district, Dingell was instrumental in passage of the Medicare Act, the Water Quality Act of 1965, Clean Water Act of 1972, the Endangered Species Act of 1973, the Clean Air Act of 1990, and the Affordable Care Act, among others. He was most proud of his work on the Civil Rights Act of 1964.

Dingell announced on February 24, 2014, that he would not seek reelection to a 31st term in Congress. His wife, Debbie Dingell, ran to succeed him and defeated Republican Terry Bowman in the general election on November 4, 2014. President Barack Obama awarded him the Presidential Medal of Freedom in 2014.

Early life, education, and early career 
Dingell was born on July 8, 1926, in Colorado Springs, Colorado, the son of Grace (née Bigler) and John Dingell Sr. (1894–1955). His father was the son of Polish immigrants, and his mother had Swiss and Scots-Irish ancestry. The Dingells were in Colorado in search of a cure for Dingell Sr.'s tuberculosis. The Dingell surname had been Dzięglewicz, and was "Americanized" by John Dingell Sr.'s father.

The family moved back to Michigan, and in 1932, Dingell Sr. was elected the first representative of Michigan's newly created 15th District. In Washington, D.C., John Jr. attended Georgetown Preparatory School and then the House Page School when he served as a page for the U.S. House of Representatives from 1938 to 1943. He was on the floor of the House when President Franklin D. Roosevelt gave his famous speech after the bombing of Pearl Harbor. In 1944, at the age of 18, Dingell joined the United States Army. He rose to the rank of second lieutenant and received orders to take part in the first wave of a planned invasion of Japan in November 1945; the Congressman said that President Harry S. Truman's decision to use the atomic bomb to end the war saved his life.

Dingell attended Georgetown University in Washington, D.C., where he earned a Bachelor of Science in chemistry in 1949 and a Juris Doctor in 1952. He was a lawyer in private practice, a research assistant to U.S. District Court judge Theodore Levin, a congressional employee, a forest ranger, and assistant prosecuting attorney for Wayne County until 1955.

U.S. House of Representatives

Elections 

In 1955, John Sr. died and John Jr. won a special election to succeed him. He won a full term in 1956 and was reelected 29 times, including runs in 1988 and 2006 with no Republican opponent. Dingell received less than 62% of the vote on only two occasions. In 1994 when the Republican Revolution swept the Republicans into the majority in the House of Representatives for the first time since 1954, Dingell received 59% of the vote. In 2010 when the Republicans re-took control of the House of Representatives, Dingell received 57% of the vote. Between them, he and his father represented the southeastern Michigan area for 80 years. His district was numbered as the 15th District from 1955 to 1965, when redistricting merged it into the Dearborn-based 16th District; in the primary that year, he defeated 16th District incumbent John Lesinski Jr.

In 2002, redistricting merged Dingell's 16th District with the Washtenaw County and western Wayne County-based 13th District, represented by fellow Democratic Representative Lynn Rivers, whom Dingell also bested in the Democratic primary. The 15th District for the 109th Congress included Wayne County suburbs generally southwest of Detroit, the Ann Arbor and Ypsilanti areas in Washtenaw County, and all of Monroe County. For many years, Dingell represented much of western Detroit itself, though Detroit's declining population and the growth of its suburbs has pushed all of Detroit into the districts of fellow Democratic representatives, including John Conyers. Dingell always won re-election by double-digit margins, although the increasing conservatism of the mostly white suburbs of Detroit since the 1970s led to several serious Republican challenges in the 1990s. With the retirement of Jamie L. Whitten, the death of William Natcher, and the defeat of Texas Representative Jack Brooks at the start of a new Congress in January 1995, he became the Dean of the United States House of Representatives. (Fellow Representative Sidney Yates had entered the House earlier and, at that time, had served almost five years longer than Dingell, but Yates's service had been interrupted when he ran unsuccessfully for Senate in 1962.) He was one of four people to serve in the House for 50 years, the others being Whitten, Carl Vinson, and Conyers, the last of whom had worked in Dingell's congressional office.

Tenure 

Dingell was generally classified as a moderately liberal member of the Democratic Party and throughout his career he was a leading congressional supporter of organized labor, social welfare measures and traditional progressive policies. At the beginning of every Congress, Dingell introduced a bill providing for a national health insurance system, the same bill that his father proposed while he was in Congress. Dingell also strongly supported Bill Clinton's managed-care proposal early in his administration. In October 1998, President Clinton began a Roosevelt Room appearance "by thanking Senator Jay Rockefeller of West Virginia and Congressman Dingell for their steadfast support of Medicare and their participation in our Medicare Commission."

On some issues, though, he reflected the values of his largely Catholic and working-class district. He supported the Vietnam War until 1971. While he supported all of the civil rights bills, he opposed expanding school desegregation to Detroit suburbs via mandatory busing. He took a fairly moderate position on abortion. He worked to balance clean air legislation with the need to protect manufacturing jobs.

An avid sportsman and hunter, he strongly opposed gun control, and was a former board member of the National Rifle Association. For many years, Dingell received an A+ rating from the NRA. Dingell helped make firearms exempt from the 1972 Consumer Product Safety Act so that the Consumer Product Safety Commission had no authority to recall defective guns. Dingell's wife, Representative Debbie Dingell, introduced legislation in 2018 to remove this exemption from the law.

Michael Barone wrote of Dingell in 2002:

On December 15, 2005, on the floor of the House, Dingell read a poem sharply critical of, among other things, Fox News, Bill O'Reilly, and the so-called "War on Christmas". Along with John Conyers, in April 2006, Dingell brought an action against George W. Bush and others alleging violations of the Constitution in the passing of the Deficit Reduction Act of 2005. The case (Conyers v. Bush) was ultimately dismissed for lack of standing.

After winning re-election in 2008 for his 28th consecutive term, Dingell surpassed Whitten's record for having the longest tenure in the House on February 11, 2009. In honor of the record, Michigan Governor Jennifer Granholm declared February 11, 2009, to be John Dingell Day.

On June 7, 2013, Dingell became the longest serving member of Congress, surpassing the late Senator Robert Byrd's combined House and Senate service of 20,995 days.  By the time Dingell retired on January 3, 2015, he had served 21,571 days in Congress, all of it in the House of Representatives.

As of January 3, 2015, Dingell had served with 2,453 different U.S. Representatives in his career.

Energy and Commerce chairman 
Dingell was well known for his approach to congressional oversight of the executive branch. He subpoenaed numerous government officials to testify before the committee and grilled them for hours. He insisted that all who testified before his committee do so under oath, thus exposing them to perjury charges if they did not tell the truth. He and his committee uncovered numerous instances of corruption and waste, such as the use of $600 toilet seats at the Pentagon. He also claimed that the committee's work led to resignations of many Environmental Protection Agency officials, and uncovered information that led to legal proceedings that sent many Food and Drug Administration officials to jail.

After serving as the committee's ranking Democratic member for 12 years, Dingell regained the chairmanship in 2007. According to Newsweek, he had wanted to investigate the George W. Bush Administration's handling of port security, the Medicare prescription drug program and Dick Cheney's energy task force. Time magazine has stated that he had intended to oversee legislation that addresses global warming and climate change caused by carbon emissions from automobiles, energy companies and industry.

Dingell lost the chairmanship for the 111th Congress to Congressman Henry Waxman of California in a Democratic caucus meeting on November 20, 2008. Waxman mounted a challenge against Dingell on grounds that Dingell was stalling certain environmental legislation, which would have tightened vehicle emissions standards—something that could be detrimental to the Big Three automobile manufacturers that constitute a major source of employment in Dingell's district. Dingell was given the title of Chairman Emeritus in a token of appreciation of his years of service on the committee, and a portrait of him is in the House collection.

Baltimore case 
In the 1980s, Dingell led a series of congressional hearings to pursue alleged scientific fraud by Thereza Imanishi-Kari and Nobel Prize-winner David Baltimore. The National Institutes of Health's fraud unit, then called the Office of Scientific Integrity, charged Imanishi-Kari in 1991 of falsifying data and recommended that she be barred from receiving research grants for 10 years. She appealed the decision and the Department of Health and Human Services appeals panel dismissed the charges against Imanishi-Kari and cleared her to receive grants. The findings and negative publicity surrounding them made David Baltimore decide to resign as president of Rockefeller University (after Imanishi-Kari was cleared he became president of the California Institute of Technology). The story of the case is described in Daniel Kevles' 1998 book The Baltimore Case, in a chapter of Horace Freeland Judson's 2004 book The Great Betrayal: Fraud In Science, and in a 1993 study by Serge Lang, updated and reprinted in his book Challenges.

Robert Gallo claims 
From 1991 to 1995 Dingell's staff investigated claims that Robert Gallo had used samples supplied to him by Luc Montagnier to fraudulently claim to have discovered the AIDS virus. The report concluded that Gallo had engaged in fraud and that the NIH covered up his misappropriation of work by the French team at the Institut Pasteur. The report contended that:

The report was never formally published as a subcommittee report because of the 1995 change in control of the House from Democratic to Republican. Other accusations against Gallo were dropped, and while Montagnier's group is considered to be the first to isolate the virus, Gallo's has been recognized as first to prove that this virus was the cause of AIDS.

Environment 

For his conduct regarding environmental issues during the 109th Congress, the lobby group League of Conservation Voters (LCV) awarded Dingell its highest rating, 100%. According to the LCV, Dingell voted "pro-environment" on twelve out of twelve issues the group deemed critical; they also praised him for introducing, along with representatives James Oberstar and Jim Leach, an amendment compelling the United States Environmental Protection Agency (EPA) to rescind a directive issued in 2003 by the Bush Administration "requiring EPA staff to get permission from headquarters before protecting 'isolated' water bodies like vernal pools, prairie potholes, playa lakes and bogs," which provide "critical wildlife habitat, store flood water, and protect drinking water supplies." Dingell was also a member of the Congressional Wildlife Refuge Caucus.

Dingell opposed raising mandatory automobile fuel efficiency standards, which he helped to write in the 1970s. Instead, he indicated that he intended to pursue a regulatory structure that takes greenhouse gas emissions and oil consumption into account. In a July 2007 interview with thehill.com, he said "I have made it very plain that I intend to see to it that CAFE is increased" and pointed out that his plan would have Corporate Average Fuel Economy (CAFE) standards increased tantamount to those in the Senate bill recently passed. In November 2007, working with House Speaker Nancy Pelosi, Dingell helped draft an energy bill that would mandate 40% increase in fuel efficiency standards.

In June 1999, Dingell released a report in which the General Accounting Office cited concurrent design and construction was the reason for production of high levels of explosive benzene gas. In a statement, Dingell asserted that "mismanagement by the United States Department of Energy and Westinghouse led to an extraordinary, and pathetic, waste of taxpayer money. All we have to show for $500 million is a 20-year delay and the opportunity to risk another $1 billion to make a problematic process work."

In July 2007, Dingell indicated he planned to introduce a new tax on carbon usage in order to curtail greenhouse gas emissions. The policy has been criticized by some, as polling numbers show voters may be unwilling to pay for the changes. A Wall Street Journal editorial claimed that vehicle emissions standards that he supported will not yield any substantial greenhouse gas emissions savings.

As one of his final votes, Dingell voted against the Keystone XL pipeline on November 13, 2014.

Private sector ties 
Dingell was closely tied to the automotive industry, as he represented Metro Detroit, where the Big Three automakers of General Motors, Chrysler, and the Ford Motor Company, are headquartered. Dingell encouraged the companies to improve fuel efficiency. During the automotive industry crisis of 2008–10, Dingell advocated for the bailout the companies received.
During the electoral span of 1989 through 2006, intermediaries for the aforementioned corporations contributed more than $600,000 to Dingell's campaigns. Dingell also held an unknown quantity, more than $1 million in 2005, in assets through General Motors stock options and savings-stock purchase programs; his wife, Debbie Dingell, is a descendant of one of the Fisher brothers, founders of Fisher Body, a constituent part of General Motors. She worked as a lobbyist for the corporation until they married. She then moved to an administrative position there. As of June 2007, Debbie Dingell was executive director of Global Community Relations and Government Relation at GM and vice chair of the General Motors Foundation.

Committee assignments 

 Committee on Energy and Commerce
 Subcommittee on Commerce, Manufacturing and Trade
 Subcommittee on Communications and Technology
 Subcommittee on Energy and Power (ex officio)
 Subcommittee on Environment and Economy
 Subcommittee on Health
 Subcommittee on Oversight and Investigations (ex officio)

Caucus memberships 
 Congressional Cement Caucus

Personal life 
Dingell had four children from his first marriage to Helen Henebry, an airline stewardess. They married in 1952 and divorced in 1972. Dingell's son Christopher D. Dingell served in the Michigan State Senate and is a judge on the Michigan Third Circuit Court.

In 1981, Dingell married Deborah "Debbie" Insley, his second wife, who was 27 years his junior. 
In November 2014, Debbie Dingell won the election to succeed her husband as U.S. Representative for Michigan's 12th congressional district. She took office in January 2015. She is the first non-widowed woman to immediately succeed her husband in Congress.

Dingell had surgery in 2014 to correct an abnormal heart rhythm, and the next year had surgery to install a pacemaker. He was hospitalized after a fall in 2017. On September 17, 2018, Dingell suffered an apparent heart attack and was hospitalized at Henry Ford Hospital in Detroit.

In his later years, Dingell became an active Twitter user, and earned over 250,000 followers for his witty and sarcastic posts attacking Republicans, particularly Donald Trump. He earned the nickname "the Dean of Twitter".

In 2018, Dingell was diagnosed with prostate cancer, which had metastasized. He chose to forgo treatment, and entered hospice care. Dingell died on February 7, 2019, at his home in Dearborn, Michigan. On the day of his death, Dingell authored a column discussing his "last words" for the country, which was published in The Washington Post.

Legacy 
The John D. Dingell Jr. Conservation, Management, and Recreation Act, named in his honor and signed into law on March 12, 2019, permanently reauthorized the Land and Water Conservation Fund and established multiple areas of land protection. He received the Walter P. Reuther Humanitarian Award from Wayne State University in 2006. A road traversing Detroit Airport is named after Dingell.

On December 18, 2019, a day after Dingell's wife Rep. Debbie Dingell, who succeeded her husband as the member of the House of Representatives for Michigan's 12th district, voted yes to both articles of Donald Trump's first impeachment, Trump attacked John Dingell at a rally. Recounting a phone call with Dingell's widow in which she thanked the President for his support for a military flyover of her husband's funeral, Trump claimed Rep. Debbie Dingell told him  "'John would be so thrilled. He's looking down. He would be so thrilled. Thank you so much sir'" Trump continued to the rally attendees "I said that's okay don't worry about it. Maybe he's looking up, I don't know. I don't know, maybe. Maybe. But let's assume he's looking down.", the implication being that the president believed John Dingell was in Hell. This drew a strong criticism from several Democratic and some Republican politicians, several of whom offered praise for John Dingell's legacy. Politicians from both sides offered support to his widow and some Republican lawmakers apologized for the president's comments.

References

Further reading

External links 

 
 
 Arlington National Cemetery

|-

|-

|-

|-

|-

|-

|-

|-

|-

1926 births
2019 deaths
20th-century American lawyers
20th-century American politicians
21st-century American politicians
American people of Scotch-Irish descent
American people of Swiss-German descent
American politicians of Polish descent
Burials at Arlington National Cemetery
Deans of the United States House of Representatives
Deaths from cancer in Michigan
Deaths from prostate cancer
Democratic Party members of the United States House of Representatives from Michigan
John
Georgetown Preparatory School alumni
Georgetown University Law Center alumni
Michigan lawyers
Military personnel from Colorado
Military personnel from Detroit
People from Colorado Springs, Colorado
Politicians from Colorado Springs, Colorado
Politicians from Detroit
Presidential Medal of Freedom recipients
United States Army officers
United States Army personnel of World War II